The Battle of Tacubaya took place on 11 April 1859 near the ancient village of Tacubaya in today's Federal District, Mexico City, Mexico, between elements of the liberal army, under General Santos Degollado and elements of the conservative army commanded by General Leonardo Marquez during the War of Reform. The victory corresponded to the preservative side, generating heavy casualties on both sides. After the battle General Miramon ordered Marquez to shoot the chiefs and officers Liberals captured in defeat, including the head of the Army Medical Corps was, as well as other liberal doctors, is why Leonardo Marquez know him as the Tiger of Tacubaya.

References 

History of Mexico City
1859 in Mexico
Conflicts in 1859
Reform War